Ștefan Gheorghe Nicolau (1874 in Ploiești – 1970 in Bucharest ) was a Romanian physician, dermato-venerologist. In 1948, he was elected an honorary member of the Romanian Academy.

Notes

1874 births
1970 deaths
Honorary members of the Romanian Academy